Alan Mackin (born 29 July 1955) is a Scottish former professional footballer who played as a central defender.

Career
Born in Lennoxtown, Mackin played for Renfrew, Queen's Park, Motherwell, Falkirk, Morton, Partick Thistle, East Stirlingshire, Alloa Athletic, Queen of the South and Clyde.

After retiring from playing, Mackin was involved with the running East Stirlingshire, both as a chairman, and as a director.

Personal life
His son, also named Alan, was a professional tennis player.

References

1955 births
Living people
Scottish footballers
Renfrew F.C. players
Queen's Park F.C. players
Motherwell F.C. players
Falkirk F.C. players
Greenock Morton F.C. players
Partick Thistle F.C. players
East Stirlingshire F.C. players
Alloa Athletic F.C. players
Queen of the South F.C. players
Clyde F.C. players
Scottish Football League players
Association football defenders
Scottish football managers
East Stirlingshire F.C. managers
Scottish Football League managers